The SSB DT 8, also known as S-DT 8, is a type of light rail vehicle used on the Stuttgart Stadtbahn system.

Technical specifications
The trains are formed as two-car sets, with steel car bodies. Up to three sets can operate in multiple. The DT8.10 trains are equipped with IGBT inverters and AC motors. DT8.10 trains and DT8.12 trains have air conditioning.

History
Testing of three prototype trains began in 1982 on the Alb Valley Railway.

First and second batch trains were built by multiple manufacturers, including Duewag, Siemens, and Bombardier.

The first DT8.10 set was delivered in April 1999.

20 Stadler Tango-based DT8.12 were ordered in 2010. Additional 20 sets were ordered in 2014, and further 20 sets were ordered in 2017.

Preserved examples
Two prototype cars were formerly stored at Heslach depot, and were to be moved to the  Bad Cannstatt in 2018.

References

External links

SSB fleet information 

Tram vehicles of Germany
Transport in Stuttgart

750 V DC multiple units
Siemens multiple units
Stadler Rail multiple units
Adtranz multiple units